Leszek Ojrzyński (born 31 May 1972) is a Polish former player and current manager.

Ojrzyński played for Pomowiec Sońsk, Tęcza Płońsk and AZS AWF Warszawa.

He was the manager of Ekstraklasa teams such as Korona Kielce, Podbeskidzie Bielsko-Biała and Górnik Zabrze. Previously he also managed a youth team of Legia Warsaw, Milan Milanówek, the reserve team of Polonia Warsaw, Znicz Pruszków, Wisła Płock, Raków Częstochowa, Odra Wodzisław Śląski and Zagłębie Sosnowiec. He was appointed manager of Arka Gdynia in April 2017. He left the club in June 2018.

On 11 November 2020, he was announced as the manager of Stal Mielec. On 12 April 2021 he was dismissed.

On 17 December 2021, Ojrzyński made his return to Korona Kielce, signing a contract to manage the team until the end of the 2022–23 season. Korona finished the season in fourth and entered promotion play-offs, won by Korona after a last-minute goal by Jacek Kiełb in extra-time of the final against Chrobry Głogów on 29 May 2022. However, the team struggled after their return to top flight, resulting in Ojrzyński being relieved of his duties following a 1–1 home draw against Piast Gliwice on 29 October 2022.

Private life
His son is a goalkeeper Jakub Ojrzyński, who has represented the colours of Legia Warsaw II, Liverpool and Caernarfon Town.

Honours

Manager

Arka Gdynia
Polish Cup: 2016–17
Polish Super Cup: 2017

References

1972 births
Living people
People from Ciechanów
Polish footballers
Association football goalkeepers
Polish football managers
Ekstraklasa managers
I liga managers
Odra Wodzisław Śląski managers
Korona Kielce managers
Podbeskidzie Bielsko-Biała managers
Zagłębie Sosnowiec managers
Znicz Pruszków managers
Raków Częstochowa managers
Górnik Zabrze managers
Arka Gdynia managers
Sportspeople from Masovian Voivodeship